Hilton W. Boyce (December 14, 1817 - December 6, 1874) was a member of the Wisconsin State Assembly during the Session of 1862. He was an Independent Republican.

References

Republican Party members of the Wisconsin State Assembly
1817 births
1874 deaths
19th-century American politicians